Henson Perrymoore Barnes (November 18, 1934 – November 22, 2015) was an American politician, businessman, and lawyer.

Political career
Barnes served in the North Carolina House of Representatives from 1975 to 1977, and as a member of the North Carolina Senate from 1977 to 1992.

In his last two terms in the Senate (1989 to 1992), Barnes served as President pro tempore. Under Barnes, that position's power increased at the expense of the Lieutenant Governor, who holds the title of President of the Senate. Shortly after his retirement from the Senate, Barnes published a history of the legislature, A Work in Progress: The North Carolina General Assembly (1993).

Background
Following service in the United States Army, Barnes was educated at Wilmington College (now UNC-Wilmington) for two years before earning his bachelor's degree from the University of North Carolina at Chapel Hill and juris doctor degree from the University of North Carolina School of Law. He practiced law in Goldsboro, North Carolina from 1961 until 1997. He once served as chairman of the Wayne County Democratic Party. After retiring from the senate he moved to White Lake, North Carolina where he continued to live and operate the family blueberry farm. Barnes died on November 22, 2015 in Raleigh, North Carolina.

References

External links
NC Senate Resolution honoring Barnes
"There is, too, a legislative history" by Jack Betts
NC Bar Association: General Practice Hall Of Fame Adds Eight Inductees

1934 births
2015 deaths
Democratic Party members of the North Carolina House of Representatives
Democratic Party North Carolina state senators
North Carolina lawyers
Businesspeople from North Carolina
University of North Carolina at Wilmington alumni
University of North Carolina School of Law alumni
Writers from North Carolina
20th-century American businesspeople
20th-century American lawyers